New Paltz is an incorporated U.S. town in Ulster County, New York. The population was 14,407 at the 2020 census. The town is located in the southeastern part of the county and is south of Kingston. New Paltz contains a village, also with the name New Paltz. The town is named for Palz, the dialect name of the Palatinate, called Pfalz in standard German.

Due to the presence of what is now the State University of New York at New Paltz, it has been a college town for over 150 years.

History
The town of New Paltz was founded in 1678 by French Huguenots by both patent from the governor and purchase from the local Esopus tribe of the Lenape people. Prior to the purchase of New Paltz during the 17th century, the Esopus tribe had been pressured off much of their land which is now present day Ulster and Sullivan counties, because of conflicts known as the Esopus Wars. The Huguenots were religious refugees from France who had immigrated via Mannheim in the German Palatinate, where they had settled after fleeing France during religious persecution. They settled in the area of the present-day village of New Paltz (on what is now known as Huguenot Street Historic District) and established their own local government.

The size of the town increased with annexation from surrounding regions in 1775 and 1809. In 1842, part of New Paltz was removed to form the Town of Esopus. More of New Paltz was removed in order to form the towns of Rosendale (1844), Lloyd (1845), and Gardiner (1853).

Geography
The Wallkill River flows northward through New Paltz on its way to join the Rondout Creek, which in turn feeds into the Hudson River. A portion of the Shawangunk Ridge is in the town.

Transportation
New Paltz is accessible by a number of different roads. Interstate 87 (the New York State Thruway) is the main thoroughfare and passes through in the eastern part and houses Exit 18 for Route 299. State routes that traverse through are Route 32, Route 208, and Route 299.

Both Amtrak and Metro-North trains serve Poughkeepsie. Adirondack Trailways also provides bus transportation from New Paltz into various locations across multiple states.

The western terminus of the Hudson Valley Rail Trail is located here.  The hiking/biking path eventually crosses the Walkway Over The Hudson and becomes the Dutchess Rail Trail that ends in Hopewell Junction.

Education
New Paltz has  four public schools (K-12) and is home to a college in the SUNY system:
Duzine Elementary School (K-2)
Lenape Elementary School (3-5)
New Paltz Middle School (6-8)
New Paltz High School (9-12)
State University of New York at New Paltz
The town is also home to several private schools, including Mountain Laurel Waldorf School (Pre-K through Grade 8), Montessori of New Paltz (Pre-K through Grade 3), and Huguenot Street Cooperative Nursery School (Pre-K).

Government
The town is governed by a town council, composed of four at-large members and a supervisor.  There is also a village of New Paltz within the town, governed by a mayor and a board of trustees.

Demographics

2010 census
As of the 2010 census, the population was 14,003. The racial makeup of the town was 84.72% White, 5.35% Black or African American, 0.31% Native American, 4.36% Asian, 0.04% Pacific Islander, 2.46% from other races, and 2.76% from two or more races. Hispanic or Latino of any race were 8.81% of the population.

2020 census
As of the 2020 census, the population was 14,407. The racial makeup of the town was 74.01% White, 5.72% Black or African American, 0.26% Native American, 5.46% Asian, 0.06% Pacific Islander, 5.11% from other races, and 8.67% from two or more races. Hispanic or Latino of any race were 12.74% of the population.

Historic places
 Minnewaska State Park
 Elting Memorial Library
 Huguenot Street Historic District
 Mohonk Mountain House

Notable people
 Abe Attell, boxing champion
 Terry Austin, comic book artist
 Benjamin F. Church, pioneer
 Charles Davis, NFL player and television commentator
 Peter Dinklage, actor.
 Lewis DuBois, military commander in the Continental Army
 Louis DuBois, Huguenot colonist
 Sandy Duncan, Broadway and television actor
 Ronald Enroth (born 1938), Professor of Sociology at Westmont College.

 Vladimir Feltsman, piano teacher
 Mary Gordon, novelist
 Hasbrouck family, one of the founding families of New Paltz
 Owen King, author
 Jay Le Fevre, former US Congress member
 Dana Lyons, musician
 Floyd Patterson, heavyweight boxing champion
 Sydney Schanberg, former journalist at the New York Times and professor at State University of New York at New Paltz
 Keith Schiller, law enforcement officer and security expert
 John Turturro, Hollywood actor
 Andrew Yang, founder of Venture for America and 2020 candidate for U.S. president

Sister city
 Niimi, Okayama Prefecture, Japan

See also

References

External links
 Town of New Paltz, N.Y.
 Village of New Paltz, N.Y.

 
Huguenot history in the United States
Shawangunks
Wallkill River
French North America
Palatine German settlement in New York (state)
Towns in Ulster County, New York
Populated places established in 1678
1678 establishments in the Province of New York
Towns in the New York metropolitan area